Stopping and Range of Ions in Matter (SRIM) is a group of computer programs which calculate interactions between ions and matter; the core of SRIM is a program called Transport of Ions in Matter (TRIM). SRIM is popular in the ion implantation research and technology community, and also used widely in other branches of radiation material science.

History
SRIM originated in 1980 as a DOS based program then called TRIM. The DOS version was upgraded until 1998 and is still available for download. It will run on a Unix PC having a DOS emulator. SRIM-2000 requires a computer with any Windows operating system. The program may work with Unix or Macintosh based systems through Wine.

The programs were developed by James F. Ziegler and Jochen P. Biersack around 1983  and are being continuously upgraded with the major changes occurring approximately every five years. SRIM is based on a Monte Carlo simulation method, namely the 
binary collision approximation with a random selection of the impact parameter of the next colliding ion.

Operation
As the input parameters, it needs the ion type and energy (in the range 10 eV – 2 GeV) and the material of one or several target layers. As the output, it lists or plots the three-dimensional distribution of the ions in the solid and its parameters, such as penetration depth, its spread along the ion beam (called straggle) and perpendicular to it, all target atom cascades in the target are followed in detail; concentration of vacancies, sputtering rate, ionization, and phonon production in the target material; energy partitioning between the nuclear and electron losses, energy deposition rate;

The programs are made so they can be interrupted at any time, and then resumed later.
They have an easy-to-use user interface and built-in default parameters for all ions and materials. 
Another part of the software allows calculating the electronic stopping power of any ion in any material (including gaseous
targets) based on an averaging parametrization of a vast range of experimental data.
Those features made SRIM immensely popular. However, it doesn't take account of the crystal structure nor dynamic composition changes in the material that severely limits its usefulness in some cases.

Other approximations of the program include binary collision (i.e. the influence of neighboring atoms is neglected); the material is fully amorphous, i.e. description of ion channeling effects is not possible, recombination of knocked off atoms (interstitials) with the vacancies, an effect known to be very important in heat spikes in metals, is neglected;

There is no description of defect clustering and irradiation-induced amorphization, even though the former occurs in most materials and the latter is very important in semiconductors.

The electronic stopping power is an averaging fit to a large number of experiments. and the interatomic potential as a universal form which is an averaging fit to quantum mechanical calculations, the target atom which reaches the surface can leave the surface (be sputtered) if it has momentum and energy to pass the surface barrier, which is a simplifying assumption that does not work well e.g. at energies below the surface penetration energy or if chemical effects are present.

The system is layered, i.e. simulation of materials with composition differences in 2D or 3D is not possible.

The threshold displacement energy is a step function for each element, even though in reality it is crystal-direction dependent.

See also
Binary collision approximation
Stopping power (particle radiation)
Attenuation length
Collision cascade
Sputtering
Ion implantation

Further reading

References

External links
The web portal of SRIM/TRIM program

Condensed matter physics
Materials science
Nuclear physics